Bernard Hibbitts is a Canadian lawyer, law professor, academic entrepreneur, editor and publisher currently teaching in the United States at the University of Pittsburgh School of Law. Trained as a legal historian, his early work focused on the historical relationship between law, technology and the senses. In the mid-1990s he wrote a series of controversial articles on the future of law reviews and scholarly publishing in the then-just-emerging age of the Internet. He is best known today as the founder, publisher & Editor-in-Chief of JURIST, the Webby award-winning online legal news service he created in 1996 that is now powered by a volunteer team of over 80 students from 29 law schools in the US, the UK, continental Europe, Kenya, Mauritius, Australia and New Zealand. He is Chairman of the Board of Directors of JURIST Legal News and Research Services, Inc., the 501(c)(3) non-profit corporation he organized to operate JURIST in 2008.

Hibbitts is a Rhodes Scholar (Maritimes, 1981) and a former law clerk at the Supreme Court of Canada for the late Justice Gerald Le Dain, whom he served from 1984-85 after his original employer, Chief Justice Bora Laskin, died in office. He is a graduate in law of University College, Oxford (B.A. Jurisprudence 1983), Dalhousie University (LL.B. 1984), the University of Toronto (LL.M. 1986), and the Harvard Law School (LL.M. 1988), where he was an Associate Editor of the Harvard International Law Journal. He also holds a B.A. in Political Science (1980) from Dalhousie University and the University of King's College in Halifax, Canada, where he received the Governor General's Medal and the Eric Dennis Gold Medal in Political Science, and an M.A. in International Affairs (1981) from the Norman Paterson School of International Affairs at Carleton University in Ottawa, Canada. At the University of Pittsburgh School of Law Hibbitts teaches courses on early legal cultures and the history of the legal profession from ancient Greece through medieval England to modern America. He is a winner of the Pitt Law Student Bar Association's Excellence in Teaching Award, and in 1995 he received the Chancellor's Distinguished Teaching Award, the University of Pittsburgh's highest teaching honor.   

His scholarship on American, English and Canadian legal history, on legal publishing, and on law, technology and the senses has been printed in Law & History Review, the New York University Law Review, the University of Pittsburgh Law Review, the Emory Law Journal, Law Library Journal, the University of Toronto Law Journal, the McGill Law Journal, the Anglo-American Law Review, Educause Quarterly, Innovate and Wired Magazine and in other scholarly journals and collections. Between 1996 and 1998 he posted several of his articles and conference presentations on his own (now archived) personal website, one of the first created by a law professor. In 1996 he was the first law professor to publicly post a full-length law review article online prior to its print publication in a scholarly legal journal. Today this is common professorial practice on the Social Science Research Network and similar platforms.  

Representing Queen Elizabeth High School in Halifax, Hibbitts was a member of the 1975 Canadian national championship team on Reach for the Top, the long-running CBC-TV high school quiz show. He received the Most Valuable Player (MVP) award as goaltender for the Oxford Blues ice hockey team in 1983.

In 2015, Hibbitts received the John D. Lawson Award from the Canadian-American Bar Association. The award recognizes Canadians who have excelled in the practice of law or have otherwise made an outstanding contribution to law or legal scholarship in the United States.

External links
Bernard Hibbitts - official website
 Coming to Our Senses: Communication and Legal Expression in Performance Cultures, Emory Law Journal (1992)
 Making Sense of Metaphors: Visuality, Aurality, and the Reconfiguration of American Legal Discourse, Cardozo Law Review (1994)
 Re-membering law: Legal Gesture in the Past, Present and Future (1995)
 'Unconventional' Methods Earn Hibbitts University Teaching Award University of Pittsburgh School of Law Law Notes (1995)
 Last Writes? Re-assessing the Law Review in the Age of Cyberspace (1996)
 Symposium Issue on Last Writes?  Akron Law Review (1996)
 Yesterday Once More: Skeptics, Scribes and the Demise of Law Reviews Akron Law Review (1996)
 De-scribing Law: Performance in the Constitution of Legality (1996)
 The Re-vision of Law: The Pictorial Turn in American Legal Culture (1996)
 E-Journals, Archives and Knowledge Networks First Monday (1997)
 Taking 'Writes' Seriously: The Future(?) of the Law Review (1997)
 Changing Our Minds: Legal History Meets the World Wide Web Law & History Review (1997)
 Academic Public Services Websites and the Future of Academic Public Service (2005)
The People's Law, Pitt Magazine (2006)
Online project at University of Pittsburgh targets legal issues (2007)
Paper Chase is ‘Doing Public Service,‘ Sharing Info Real Time and For Free, ABA Journal (2008)
The Technology of Law (2010)
In conversation with Professor Bernard Hibbitts, Publisher and Editor in Chief of JURIST (2020)
Legal education should prepare students for the 21st century, not the 19th: Prof. Bernard Hibbitts (2020)
 JURIST

References

Living people
Canadian legal scholars
American legal writers
University of Pittsburgh faculty
Harvard Law School alumni
Schulich School of Law alumni
Canadian Rhodes Scholars
Alumni of University College, Oxford
University of Toronto alumni
Year of birth missing (living people)